Wies Moens (28 January 1898 – 5 February 1982) was a literary historian, poet and Flamingant activist from Flanders. He was also a founding member of the Verdinaso, but left the movement after its change of course in 1934.

He was born in Sint-Gillis-bij-Dendermonde, the only child of baker Karel Moens and Johanna Moreels. Between 1916 and 1918 he studied German philology at Von Bissing University (the Flemish version of the University of Ghent set up during the German occupation). He was a member of the Flemish Movement, and after the First World War he was imprisoned for his activities during the war. The Flemish Literary Society requested his release through a petition signed by many, and in March 1921 Moens was set free. His expressionistic poetry was published in Ruimte magazine, which also published Paul van Ostaijen. Aside from that he was secretary of the Vlaamsche Volkstooneel (Flemish People's Theatre) and a journalist.

Bibliography
Gedichten 1918
Celbrieven (1920)
De boodschap (1920)
De tocht (1921)
Opgangen (1921)
Landing' (1923)Golfslag (1935)Kalewala: het epos der Finnen (1938)Het vierkant (1938)Dertig dagen oorlog (1940)Nederlandsche letterkunde van volksch standpunt gezien (1941)Onze volksche adel (1942)De spitsboog (1944)Het spoor (1944)De verslagene (1963)Het activistisch avontuur en wat erop volgde'' (1966–1970)

External links
 Flemish authors
 Dutch digital library
 
 

Flemish activists
Flemish poets
1898 births
1982 deaths
20th-century Belgian poets
Belgian male poets
20th-century Belgian male writers